This article displays the rosters for the participating teams at the 2008 FIBA Africa Club Championship for Women.

Abidjan Basket Club

APR

Club Sportif d'Abidjan

Desportivo de Maputo

Djoliba

Eagle Wings

First Bank

KCC Leopards

Kenya Ports Authority

Primeiro de Agosto

Radi

Vita Club

References

External links
 2007 FIBA Africa Champions Cup Participating Teams

FIBA Africa Women's Clubs Champions Cup squads
Basketball teams in Africa
FIBA
FIBA